The 1933 Spanish Grand Prix (formally the VIII Gran Premio de España) was a Grand Prix motor race held at Lasarte on 24 September 1933. The race was held over 30 laps of a 17.750 km circuit for a total distance of 532.500 km and was won by Louis Chiron driving an Alfa Romeo.

Classification

Fastest Lap:  Tazio Nuvolari, 6m41.2 (159.27 km/h)

References

Spanish Grand Prix
Spanish Grand Prix
Grand Prix